Nicholas (Nick) Casswell (born 1974) is an English composer specializing in chamber music.

Biography

Born on 25 July 1974 in Cheltenham, Casswell studied at the Dartington College of Arts in Devon (1993–96) and at the University of York (1998–99). Thereafter he completed his PhD studies in composition at the University of Leeds.

In 2000, his string quartet composition "Papillon" won the Leeds Philosophical and Literary Society’s Millennium Composing Award and was also performed at the 2001 Gaudeamus Music Week. The first movement of his "The Transformation and Other Stories" earned him the title of most promising composer at the 7th International Young Composers Meeting in Apeldoorn. In 2003, "Temporal Trajectories" for percussion quartet was awarded second prize at the 2nd Jurgenson International Young Composers Competition in Moscow. Under a fellowship awarded by the Arts and Humanities Research Council, he conducted research into the Korean folk music sanjo at London University's School of Oriental and African Studies. Nicholas Casswell is currently Lecturer in Interdisciplinary Performing Arts at University of Central Lancashire, Preston.

Awards
First Prize, International Composition Competition, Luxembourg, 2007.
ISCM-IAMIC Young Composer Award (2007).

Works
Among Nicholas Casswell's works are:
"Chorisis", orchestral ensemble (14 players), 1999
"Return", flute, oboe, clarinet, French horn, trumpet, violin, double bass, 1998
"Papillon", string quartet, 1999
"Methexis", alto saxophone, 1999
"Temporal Trajectories", four percussion, 2000
"The Transformation and Other Stories", two sopranos, tenor, baritone, flute, clarinet, two saxophones, two French horns, trumpet, trombone, electric guitar, bass guitar, piano, percussion, 2001
"distance ... presence", flute, clarinet, two saxophones, two French horns, trumpet, trombone, electric guitar, bass guitar, piano, percussion, 2002
"Piano Quartet", violin, viola, cello, piano, 2002
"Lumine", four male voices, 2002
"Triplicity", orchestral ensemble, 2007

Discography
"International Composition Prize Luxembourg 2007, World Premiere Recordings": Nicholas Casswell, "Triplicity"; Robert Lemay, "Mare Tranquilitatis III"; Akihiro Kano, "The Fifth Station"; Gordon Hamilton, "Sinfonietta Concertante". Luxembourg Sinfonietta, Conductor: Marcel Wengler. CD LGNM No 407.

References

British classical composers
British male classical composers
Living people
1974 births
21st-century classical composers
21st-century British male musicians